Busti may refer to:

People
 Agostino Busti (c. 1483–1548), Italian sculptor
 Alessandro Busti (born 2000), Canadian soccer goalkeeper
 Francesco Busti (1678–1767), Italian painter
 Jorge Busti (1947–2021), Argentine politician
 Paolo Busti (1749–1824), Italian financier; principal agent of the Holland Land Company
 Cristina Cremer de Busti, Argentine politician

Places
 Busti, New York, US, a town
 Busti (CDP), New York, a hamlet in the town

See also
 Abu al-Fath al-Busti (942–1010), Persian poet
 Abu Hatim Muhammad ibn Hibban ibn Ahmad al-Tamimi al-Busti (c. 884–965), or Ibn Hibban, Muslim Arab scholar
 Bust (disambiguation)